Spain competed at the 2005 Mediterranean Games in Almería, Spain. The home nation had a total number of 463 participants (289 men and 174 women).

Medals

Gold

 Athletics
Men's 800 metres: Antonio Manuel Reina
Men's 1.500 metres: Arturo Casado
Men's 110 m hurdles: Felipe Vivancos
Men's 4 × 400 m relay: David Canal, David Testa, Eugenio Barrios and Antonio Manuel Reina
Men's discus throw: Mario Pestano
Men's 20 km walk: Paquillo Fernández
Women's 100 m hurdles: Glory Alozie
Women's 4 × 400 m relay: Julia María Alba, Belén Recio, Miriam Bravo, Daisy Antonio, María Teresa Martínez and Cora Daniela Olivero
Women's high jump: Ruth Beitia

 Canoeing
Men's K-2 1000 m: Javier Hernanz and Pablo Enrique Baños

 Football
Men's team competition: Ángel Javier Arizmendi, Kepa Blanco, Iván Cuéllar, Manu del Moral, Javier Flaño, Miguel Flaño, Javi Fuego, Jesús Gámez, Carlos García, Gorka Larrea, Rubén Iván Martínez, Miki Martínez, Francisco Montañés, Antonio Puerta, Iván Ramis, Javier Tarantino, Sergio Torres and Juan Valera

 Golf
Men's singles competition: Ignacio Sánchez-Palencia
Women's singles competition: María Hernández Muñoz
Men's team competition: José Luis Adarraga, Jordi García and Ignacio Sánchez-Palencia
Women's team competition: María Hernández Muñoz, Belén Mozo and Adriana Zwank

 Handball
Men's team competition: Julen Aguinagalde, David Barrufet, Jon Belaustegui, David Davis, Raúl Entrerríos, Julio Fis, Rubén Garabaya, Juan García Lorenzana, Roberto García, Demetrio Lozano, Viran Morros, Mariano Ortega, Carlos Prieto, Albert Rocas, José María Rodríguez and José Manuel Sierra
Women's team competition: Macarena Aguilar, Patricia Alonso, Verónica Cuadrado, Aitziber Elejaga, Begoña Fernández, Soraya García, Rocio Guerola, Elisabeth López, Marta Mangué, Dolores Martín, Beatriz Morales, Noelia Oncina, Isabel María Ortuño, Susana Pareja, María Eugenia Sánchez and Yolanda SanRoman

 Gymnastics
Men's team competition: Víctor Cano, Manuel Carballo, Rafael Martínez, Iván San Miguel and Andreu Vivó

 Judo
Men's lightweight (– 73 kg): Kiyoshi Uematsu
Women's lightweight (– 57 kg): Isabel Fernández
Women's half-heavyweight (– 78 kg): Esther San Miguel

 Karate
Men's – 80 kg: Iván Leal
Women's + 65 kg: Cristina Feo

 Sailing
Women's 470 class: Natalia Via-Dufresne and Laia Lluisa Tutzo

 Swimming
Women's 800 m freestyle: Erika Villaécija
Women's 200 m breaststroke: Sara Pérez

 Tennis
Men's singles: Nicolás Almagro
Men's doubles: Nicolás Almagro and Guillermo García López
Women's singles: Laura Pous Tió
Women's doubles: Nuria Llagostera and Laura Pous Tió

 Water polo
Men's team competition: Iñaki Aguilar, Ángel Luis Andreo, Daniel Cercols, José Ramón Díaz, Xavier García, Gabriel Hernández Paz, David Martín, Guillermo Molina, Iván Pérez, Felipe Perrone, Ricardo Perrone, Oscar Rey and Xavier Vallès

 Weightlifting
Men's – 77 kg snatch: Sergio Martínez
Men's – 94 kg snatch: Santiago Martínez
Women's – 48 kg snatch: Rebeca Sires

 Wrestling
Men's freestyle (– 55 kg): Francisco Javier Sánchez

Silver
 Beach volleyball
Men's team competition: Alex Ortíz and Raúl Aro

 Judo
Women's half-middleweight (– 63 kg): Sara Álvarez
Women's heavyweight (+ 78 kg): Sandra Borderieux

 Swimming
Men's 50 m freestyle: Eduardo Lorente
Men's 200 m freestyle: Olaf Wildeboer
Men's 50 m backstroke: David Ortega
Men's 4 × 100 m freestyle: Eduardo Lorente, Javier Noriega, Saúl Santana, Olaf Wildeboer and Carlos Ballesteros
Men's 4 × 100 m medley: Iván Aguirre, Eduardo Lorente, David Ortega, Juan José Ulacía
Women's 1500 m freestyle: Erika Villaécija
Women's 100 m backstroke: Mercedes Peris
Women's 100 m breaststroke: Sara Pérez
Women's 100 m butterfly: Mireia García
Women's 200 m butterfly: Mireia García
Women's 4 × 100 m freestyle: Tatiana Rouba, María Fuster, Ilune Gorbea and Erika Villaécija
Women's 4 × 200 m freestyle: Erika Villaécija, Arantxa Ramos, Noemi Feliz and Ilune Gorbea
Women's 4 × 100 m medley: María Fuster, Mireia García, Mercedes Peris and Sara Pérez

 Volleyball
Men's team competition: Carlos Luís Carreño, Semidán Déniz, Guillermo Falasca, Miguel Ángel Falasca, Alfonso Flores, José Luis Lobato, Pedro Miralles, José Luis Moltó, Israel Rodríguez, Juan José Salvador, Manuel Sevillano and Luis Pedro Suela

 Weightlifting
Women's – 53 kg snatch: Estefanía Juan Tello
Women's – 69 kg snatch: Lydia Valentín
Women's – 69 kg clean & jerk: Tatiana Fernández
Men's – 85 kg snatch: José Juan Navarro

Bronze
 Basketball
Men's team competition: Alfons Alzamora, Germán Gabriel, Roberto Guerra, Rafael Martínez, Andrés Miso, Álex Mumbrú, Rubén Quintana, Guillermo Rubio, Fernando San Emeterio, Sergio Sánchez, Jordi Trias and Rafael Vidaurreta
Women's team competition: Elena Alamo, Laura Antoja, Sonia Blanco, Laura Camps, Sandra Gallego, Noemi Jordana, Anna Montañana, Eva Montesdeoca, Mireia Navarrete, Paula Palomares, Paula Segui and Marta Zurro

 Beach volleyball
Men's team competition: Jesús Manuel Ruiz and Agustín Correa

 Boxing
Men's light flyweight (– 48 kg): Kelvin de la Nieve
Men's flyweight (– 51 kg): Juan Padilla
Men's light welterweight (– 64 kg): José Guttierez

 Judo
Men's extra-lightweight (– 60 kg): Javier Fernández
Women's extra-lightweight (– 48 kg): Vanesa Arenas
Women's middleweight (– 70 kg): Cecilia Blanco

 Rowing
Women's single sculls: Nuria Domínguez
Women's lightweight single sculls: Teresa Mas

 Swimming
Men's 100 m backstroke: David Ortega
Men's 200 m medley: Breton Cabello
Women's 50 m freestyle: Ana Belén Palomo
Women's 50 m backstroke: Mercedes Peris
Women's 200 m breaststroke: Belen Domenech
Women's 400 m medley: Sara Pérez

 Weightlifting
Women's – 48 kg snatch: Gema Peris
Women's – 48 kg clean & jerk: Gema Peris
Women's – 53 kg clean & jerk: Estefanía Juan Tello
Women's – 69 kg snatch: Tatiana Fernández
Women's – 69 kg clean & jerk: Lydia Valentín

See also
 Spain at the 2004 Summer Olympics
 Spain at the 2008 Summer Olympics

References
 Official Site
  Spanish Olympic Committee

Nations at the 2005 Mediterranean Games
2005
Mediterranean Games